Collinsiella tuberculata is a species of green algae. It is in the genus Collinsiella of the family Gomontiaceae.

It was named in honor of algologist Frank Shipley Collins.

References

Ulotrichales